Vingerhoedtia is a genus of moths of the family Bombycidae first described by Thierry Bouyer in 2008.

Selected species
Vingerhoedtia grisea (Gaede, 1927)
Vingerhoedtia ruficollis (Strand, 1910)

References

Bombycidae